Southrey railway station is a former station in Southrey, Lincolnshire.

History
The station was opened on 17 October 1848 as part of the new  Lincolnshire Loop Line, from Peterborough to Lincoln via Spalding and Boston. This line was authorised as part of the London and York Railway bill, which received Royal assent on 26 June 1846. The Great Northern Railway began construction of the loop line in 1847.

The station closed on 5 October 1970.

Route

References

Disused railway stations in Lincolnshire
Former Great Northern Railway stations
Railway stations in Great Britain opened in 1848
Railway stations in Great Britain closed in 1970
Beeching closures in England